Ad Turres was an ancient town of Bruttium on Via Aquilia, 18 miles from Ad Sabbatum and 13 miles from Angitula. It has been identified with either Maida (by Hazlitt's Classical Gazetteer) or Lamezia Terme.

References
Hazlitt's Classical Gazetteer

Pre-Roman cities in Italy
Bruttium
Roman towns and cities in Italy